The Real Gilligan's Island is a reality television series that aired two seasons on TBS in 2004 and 2005. Contestants on the show were required to participate in challenges based on plots from the 1960s television show.  Both editions of the show were recorded in the Mexican Caribbean on a location South from Cancun. Pop-Punk group Bowling for Soup covered the original Gilligan's Island theme for the show and the show also featured music from the music producer and songwriter Brett Epstein.

Combination format
The format of the show was a combination of CBS's Survivor and the original show from the 1960s. Contestants were divided into two teams of seven to start the show (14 total contestants). Each team was composed of members that were expected to dress and act like their Gilligan's Island counterpart. Characters used were:

 Gilligan
 the Skipper, too
 the Millionaire and his Wife
 the Movie Star
 the Professor, and 
 Mary Ann

Contestants were picked partly for their real-life resemblance to their characters—real-life millionaires, actresses, and boat owners played their counterparts.

Competitions of characters and teams

Initial round: paired competitions
In the first round, the teams would participate in a series of competitions that would pit one team's character against the other's (Team A's "Ginger" against Team B's "Ginger," for example) for the right to stay on the island and compete in the second phase of the show. The competitions were set up by having members from the teams venture to "Voodoo Village" to retrieve a chest that, when opened, would reveal a voodoo doll crudely done up to look like a character. The two contestants portraying that character would then compete.

Final round: prizes, immunity, and alliances
Once the seven finalists were set, the show became very similar to Survivor. Contestants first competed in a challenge for a prize and a chance at immunity from the day's voting. Alliances and strategy was common. The contestants would then all travel to Voodoo Village and engage in a voting ceremony.

Final challenge
Once only three contestants were left, the show wrapped up with a challenge pitting the remaining players against each other. The first season was won by the millionaire Glenn Stearns. The second season was won by the Skipper ("Crazy" Charlie Albert).

Notable contestants
The "Ginger" role was filled by professional actresses.  In 2004, Nicole Eggert and Rachel Hunter competed. In 2005, Erika Eleniak and Angie Everhart competed.

In 2004, actress and television personality Mindy Burbano Stearns filled the role of "the Millionaire's Wife" along with her husband, Glenn Stearns, as "the Millionaire".

Zac Turney, who was competing to be Gilligan on season two, was previously a contestant on Legends of the Hidden Temple as a teen, and winning his episode.

The game

Season 1

 Skipper Bob was forced to leave the game due to medical reasons.

 During the team portion, there were no votes cast.

 Instead of voting, the Final 3 castaways participated in a final rescue challenge, where the challenge winner would win the game.

Season 2

 Ginger Angie was forced to leave the game because of medical reasons.  Therefore, there did not need to be a head-to-head for the Gingers.

External links 
 Official site - Season 1
 Official site - Season 2
 

2000s American reality television series
2004 American television series debuts
2005 American television series endings
TBS (American TV channel) original programming
Gilligan's Island
Works about survival skills
Adventure reality television series
Television shows filmed in Mexico